Kang Ji-wook (Hangul: 강지욱; born 7 July 1992) is a South Korean badminton player.  He first came to international attention when he became the runner-up in three different events at the 2010 BWF World Junior Championships. He won the silver medal in the  boys' singles, mixed doubles and mixed team event. He also won the gold medal in the boys' doubles event at the 2010 Asian Junior Badminton Championships, and at the same year, he competed at the Singapore Summer Youth Olympics where he won the boys' singles bronze.

Achievements

Asian Championships 
Mixed doubles

Youth Olympic Games 
Boys' singles

BWF World Junior Championships 
Boys' singles

Mixed doubles

Asia Junior Championships 
Boys' doubles

BWF Grand Prix 
The BWF Grand Prix had two levels, the BWF Grand Prix and Grand Prix Gold. It was a series of badminton tournaments sanctioned by the Badminton World Federation (BWF) which was held from 2007 to 2017.

Men's doubles

Mixed doubles

  BWF Grand Prix Gold tournament
  BWF Grand Prix tournament

BWF International Challenge/Series 
Mixed doubles

  BWF International Challenge tournament
  BWF International Series tournament

References 

1992 births
Living people
Sportspeople from Jeju Province
South Korean male badminton players
Badminton players at the 2010 Summer Youth Olympics